Mesoponera is an Old World genus of ants in the subfamily Ponerinae. It is found in the tropics, from Sub-Saharan Africa to Australia.

Species

Mesoponera ambigua (André, 1890)
Mesoponera australis (Forel, 1900)
Mesoponera caffraria (Smith, 1858)
Mesoponera elisae (Forel, 1891)
Mesoponera escherichi (Forel, 1910)
Mesoponera flavopilosa (Weber, 1942)
Mesoponera ingesta (Wheeler, 1922)
Mesoponera manni (Viehmeyer, 1924)
Mesoponera melanaria (Emery, 1893)
Mesoponera nimba (Bernard, 1953)
Mesoponera novemdentata (Bernard, 1953)
Mesoponera papuana (Viehmeyer, 1914)
Mesoponera picea (Bernard, 1953)
Mesoponera rubra (Smith, 1857)
Mesoponera scolopax (Emery, 1899)
Mesoponera senegalensis (Santschi, 1914)
Mesoponera subiridescens (Wheeler, 1922)
Mesoponera testacea (Bernard, 1953)
Mesoponera villiersi (Bernard, 1953)
Mesoponera weberi (Bernard, 1953)

References

Ponerinae
Ant genera